Pettis Township is one of ten townships in Adair County, Missouri, United States. As of the 2010 census, its population was 795. It is named for former US Congressman Spencer Pettis, who represented Missouri from 1829 to 1831 until being killed in a duel.

Geography
It contains seven cemeteries: Bragg, Canaday, Indian Hill, Indian Hill (historical), Shaver, Shoemaker and Stukey.

The streams of Elm Creek, Goose Creek, Hog Creek, Indian Creek, Sugar Creek and Turkey Run run through this township.

Transportation
Pettis Township contains one airport, Kirksville Regional Airport.

U.S. Highway 63 passes through the township.

References

 USGS Geographic Names Information System (GNIS)

External links
 US-Counties.com
 City-Data.com

Townships in Adair County, Missouri
Kirksville micropolitan area, Missouri
Townships in Missouri